The NFLPA Alan Page Community Award (APC) has been awarded by the National Football League Players Association continuously since 1967. Previously named the Byron "Whizzer" White NFL Man of the Year Award, after Byron "Whizzer" White, the award was renamed in the fall of 2018 in honor of Alan Page. Alan Page has been a stalwart for the players union since his early days as an executive committee member as well as a pioneer for social justice during his distinguished 23-year tenure on the Minnesota Supreme Court.

The award annually recognizes one player who goes above and beyond to perform community service in his hometown and team city. Past winners have included Drew Brees, Warrick Dunn, Gale Sayers, Bart Starr, Archie Manning, Peyton Manning and Ken Houston.

The 2001 recipient, Michael McCrary, was the child in the Supreme Court case Runyon v. McCrary (1976) in which Justice White had participated nearly a quarter of a century before McCrary's award.  White had dissented from the position taken by the lawyers for McCrary.

Winners

See also
Walter Camp Man of the Year
Walter Camp Distinguished American Award
Walter Camp Alumni of the Year
Amos Alonzo Stagg Award
National Football Foundation Distinguished American Award
National Football Foundation Gold Medal Winners
Theodore Roosevelt Award (NCAA)
Walter Payton Man of the Year Award
Athletes in Action/Bart Starr Award
List of National Football League awards

References

National Football League trophies and awards